Dennis William Hall (born February 5, 1971) is a Greco-Roman wrestler from Neosho, Wisconsin, United States. Hall was a 10-time US National Champion, a World Champion, and 3-time USA Olympian.  He won a silver medal at the 1996 Atlanta Olympics.

Hall attended Hartford Union High School and began his career by defeating a two-time senior state champion named Mark Riggs in the state finals as a freshman.  Hall finished his prep career with a 146-1-1 prep record including 110 pins, earning three individual Wisconsin state titles.  During his high school years he was also a three-time Junior National Greco Champion and World Team member.  He was Wisconsin's first Dream Team All-American.

Hall attended the University of Wisconsin–Madison on a full scholarship for one year.  He realized that in order for him to reach his full potential as an international Greco wrestler he would need to train differently than he would for collegiate wrestling.  He dropped out of school to train, travel and compete with the US Greco team.  Hall was named USA Wrestling Man of the Year in 1995 as well as three time Greco-Roman athlete of the year in 1994, 1995 and 1996.  Now retired from competitive wrestling, Hall lives in Plover, Wisconsin.

In 2011, Hall was inducted into the National Wrestling Hall of Fame as a Distinguished Member.

Notable achievements
 World Bronze Medalist 1994
 World Champion 1995
 Olympic Silver Medalist 1996
 3X High School State Champion
 3X Junior National US Champion
 Espoir National Champion
 10X US Open National Champion
 3X Pan Am Champion

Submission grappling record
KO PUNCHES
|- style="text-align:center; background:#f0f0f0;"
| style="border-style:none none solid solid; "|Result
| style="border-style:none none solid solid; "|Opponent
| style="border-style:none none solid solid; "|Method
| style="border-style:none none solid solid; "|Event
| style="border-style:none none solid solid; "|Date
| style="border-style:none none solid solid; "|Round
| style="border-style:none none solid solid; "|Time
| style="border-style:none none solid solid; "|Notes
|-
| Loss ||  João Roque || Decision || The Contenders || 1997 || 5 || 5:00 ||
|-

References 

 Hartford Union High School Wrestling Site
 Dennis Hall's U.S. Olympic Team bio
 Dennis Halls Training Website
 

1971 births
Living people
People from Plover, Wisconsin
Wrestlers at the 1992 Summer Olympics
Wrestlers at the 1996 Summer Olympics
Wrestlers at the 2004 Summer Olympics
American male sport wrestlers
Olympic silver medalists for the United States in wrestling
Medalists at the 1996 Summer Olympics
Pan American Games gold medalists for the United States
Pan American Games medalists in wrestling
People from Neosho, Wisconsin
Wrestlers at the 1995 Pan American Games
World Wrestling Championships medalists
Medalists at the 1995 Pan American Games